The meridian 92° east of Greenwich is a line of longitude that extends from the North Pole across the Arctic Ocean, Asia, the Indian Ocean, the Southern Ocean, and Antarctica to the South Pole.

The 92nd meridian east forms a great circle with the 88th meridian west.

From Pole to Pole
Starting at the North Pole and heading south to the South Pole, the 92nd meridian east passes through:

{| class="wikitable plainrowheaders"
! scope="col" width="120" | Co-ordinates
! scope="col" | Country, territory or sea
! scope="col" | Notes
|-valign="top"
| style="background:#b0e0e6;" | 
! scope="row" style="background:#b0e0e6;" | Arctic Ocean
| style="background:#b0e0e6;" | Passing just east of Schmidt Island, Severnaya Zemlya, Krasnoyarsk Krai, 
|-valign="top"
| 
! scope="row" | 
| Krasnoyarsk Krai — Komsomolets Island, Pioneer Island and the Sedov Archipelago, Severnaya Zemlya
|-
| style="background:#b0e0e6;" | 
! scope="row" style="background:#b0e0e6;" | Kara Sea
| style="background:#b0e0e6;" |
|-
| 
! scope="row" | 
| Krasnoyarsk Krai — Kirov Island
|-
| style="background:#b0e0e6;" | 
! scope="row" style="background:#b0e0e6;" | Kara Sea
| style="background:#b0e0e6;" |
|-valign="top"
| 
! scope="row" | 
| Krasnoyarsk Krai Tuva Republic — from 
|-
| 
! scope="row" | 
|
|-valign="top"
| 
! scope="row" |  
| Xinjiang Qinghai — from  Tibet — from 
|-
| 
! scope="row" | 
| Arunachal Pradesh — claimed by 
|-
| 
! scope="row" | 
|
|-valign="top"
| 
! scope="row" | 
| Assam Meghalaya — from 
|-
| 
! scope="row" | 
|
|-
| 
! scope="row" | 
| Tripura
|-
| 
! scope="row" | 
|
|-valign="top"
| style="background:#b0e0e6;" | 
! scope="row" style="background:#b0e0e6;" | Indian Ocean
| style="background:#b0e0e6;" | Passing just west of the Andaman Islands,  (at )
|-valign="top"
| style="background:#b0e0e6;" | 
! scope="row" style="background:#b0e0e6;" | Southern Ocean
|-
| 
! scope="row" | Antarctica
| Australian Antarctic Territory, claimed by 
|-
|}

e092 meridian east